Knysza is a type of fast food, consisting of a bread roll amply filled with a variety of ingredients. The bread is a sliced-in-half sponge cake (bułka drożdżowa), sometimes grilled prior, abundantly infilled with a variety of ingredients, including vegetables, cutlet, topped profusely with sauce.

The original knysza is vegetarian and is named "knysza with vegetables" (knysza z warzywami), with the bread roll solely infilled with fresh vegetables (white and red cabbage, tomato, cucumber and canned corn), generously topped with garlic sauce, mayonnaise or spicy sauce, besprinkled with roasted onion. Variants of knysza include those with meat, for example cutlet (kotlet), chicken or sausage, as well as a version with cheese.

Knysza is most popular in Wrocław, where the meal rose in popularity in the 1990s.

See also
Knish

External links
Guilty Pleasures: Regional Fast Foods from Poland

References

Polish cuisine
Wrocław
Silesian cuisine
Fast food